Henry John Ellenson (born January 13, 1997) is an American professional basketball player for Club Joventut Badalona of the Liga ACB. He played one season of college basketball for Marquette, before being drafted 18th overall by the Pistons in the 2016 NBA draft.

High school career
Ellenson played basketball at Rice Lake High School, where he also competed in track and field (high jump and discus). In August 2014, he was a member of the United States' National Team at the 2014 FIBA Under-17 World Championship in Dubai, scoring 21 points in the quarterfinal game with China.

As a freshman in the 2011–12 season, Ellenson averaged 12.0 points, 7.0 rebounds, 1.5 assists and 1.5 blocks per game. As a sophomore in the 2012–13 season, Ellenson averaged 21.5 points, 11.8 rebounds, 3.5 assists and 1.8 blocks per game.

Career highlights and awards
 Ellenson scored a career-high 48 points against Minnetonka High School on December 6, 2014
 2012 All-Big Rivers Conference
 2013 Associated Press All-State second team
 2013 Big Rivers Conference Player of the Year and All-Big Rivers first team
 2013 Eau Claire Leader-Telegram All-Northwest first team
 2013 Eau Claire Leader-Telegram Northwest Wisconsin Player of the Year, first sophomore to win the award
 2013 MaxPreps Sophomore All-America honorable mention
 2013 St. Paul Pioneer Press East Metro Player of the Year
 2013 Wisconsin Basketball Coaches Association Division 2 All-State first team

College career
During his only season at Marquette, Ellenson averaged a near-double-double with 17 points and 9.7 rebounds per game, with 1.8 assists and 1.5 blocks in 33.5 minutes of action over 33 games. As a result, he earned All-Big East First Team, Big East All-Freshmen Team, and Big East Freshman of the Year honors.

On April 5, 2016, Ellenson declared for the NBA draft, forgoing his final three years of college eligibility.

Professional career

Detroit Pistons (2016–2019)
On June 23, 2016, Ellenson was selected by the Detroit Pistons with the 18th overall pick in the 2016 NBA draft. On July 19, he signed his rookie scale contract with the Pistons. On October 26, he made his professional debut in a 109–91 loss to the Toronto Raptors, recording two rebounds in two minutes off the bench. During his rookie season, Ellenson had multiple assignments with the Grand Rapids Drive, the Pistons' D-League affiliate. On February 9, 2019, Ellenson was released by the Pistons.

New York Knicks (2019)
On February 20, 2019, Ellenson signed a 10-day contract with the New York Knicks. After several productive games, he signed a standard contract with the Knicks on March 2. On June 30, 2019, Ellenson joined the Knicks for the 2019 NBA Summer League.

Brooklyn Nets (2019–2020)
On July 17, 2019, Ellenson signed a two-way contract with the Brooklyn Nets. On January 3, 2020, the Nets waived Ellenson after he appeared in five games.

Raptors 905 (2020–2021)
On January 21, 2020, Ellenson was acquired by the Raptors 905 in a sign-and-trade deal with the Long Island Nets.

On November 26, 2020, Ellenson signed a deal with the Toronto Raptors. On December 19, he was waived by the team.

On January 27, 2021, Ellenson was included in roster of Raptors 905.

Toronto Raptors (2021)
On March 10, 2021, the Toronto Raptors announced that they had signed Ellenson to a 10-day contract.

Monbus Obradoiro (2021–2022)
On July 13, 2021, Ellenson signed with Monbus Obradoiro of the Liga ACB.

Joventut Badalona (2022–present)
On July 7, 2022, he has signed with Club Joventut Badalona of the Liga ACB.

Career statistics

NBA

Regular season

|-
| style="text-align:left;"|
| style="text-align:left;"|Detroit
| 19 || 2 || 7.7 || .359 || .294 || .500 || 2.2 || .4 || .1 || .1 || 3.2
|-
| style="text-align:left;"|
| style="text-align:left;"|Detroit
| 38 || 0 || 8.7 || .363 || .333 || .862 || 2.1 || .5 || .1 || .0 || 4.0
|-
| style="text-align:left;" rowspan="2"|
| style="text-align:left;"|Detroit
| 2 || 0 || 12.5 || .400 || .500 || 1.000 || 4.5 || .5 || .0 || .0 || 6.0
|-
| style="text-align:left;"|New York
| 17 || 0 || 13.8 || .412 || .441 || .739 || 3.4 || .9 || .4 || .1 || 6.0
|-
| style="text-align:left;"|
| style="text-align:left;"|Brooklyn
| 5 || 0 || 3.0 || .143 || .000 ||  || 1.2 || .2 || .0 || .0 || .4
|-
| style="text-align:left;"|
| style="text-align:left;"|Toronto
| 2 || 0 || 19.0 || .357 || .222 || .750 || 6.0 || 2.5 || .0 || .0 || 7.5
|- class="sortbottom"
| style="text-align:center;" colspan="2"|Career
| 83 || 2 || 9.5 || .371 || .336 || .773 || 2.5 || .6 || .2 || .0 || 4.1

College

|-
| style="text-align:left;"|2015–16
| style="text-align:left;"|Marquette
| 33 || 33 || 33.5 || .446 || .288 || .749 || 9.7 || 1.8 || .8 || 1.5 || 17.0

Personal life
The son of John and Holly Ellenson, he has two brothers and one sister. His father played two seasons (1986–88) of basketball at Marquette and two seasons at Wisconsin while his brother, Wally, was a member of the men's basketball and track & field teams there.

References

External links

 Marquette Golden Eagles bio
 NBA G League bio

1997 births
Living people
American expatriate basketball people in Canada
American expatriate basketball people in Spain
American men's basketball players
Basketball players from Wisconsin
Brooklyn Nets players
Detroit Pistons draft picks
Detroit Pistons players
Grand Rapids Drive players
Joventut Badalona players
Liga ACB players
Long Island Nets players
Marquette Golden Eagles men's basketball players
McDonald's High School All-Americans
New York Knicks players
Obradoiro CAB players
Parade High School All-Americans (boys' basketball)
People from Rice Lake, Wisconsin
Power forwards (basketball)
Raptors 905 players
Toronto Raptors players
United States men's national basketball team players